UEA Broad is an area of open water commonly known as a Broad. Its name is from the University of East Anglia that it neighbours.

The UEA Broad is one of the few  Broads produced by gravel extraction rather than peat digging; there is still machinery under the water. It was developed by Atlas Aggregates in conjunction with the university between August 1973 and June 1978.

The Broad is particularly well known for its bird life with great crested grebes being a common sight; other birds include kingfishers, herons, swans, sedge warblers and cuckoos.

While in the past the lake was used for windsurfing by university students, health and safety concerns have put an end to this practice. The Broad is well stocked with carp and commonly used for fishing with platforms positioned at regular intervals round the edge. The length of the lake on the northern side also plays host to several barbeque stands available for use by students and staff of the university. The favoured one lies next to a sandy area of the shoreline often known as “The Beach”, where seagulls and ducks often congregate to be fed.

References

University of East Anglia
Lakes of Norfolk